The LKL Champions are given a trophy that is awarded to the professional Lithuanian Basketball League (LKL) team, that wins the league's LKL Finals, at the conclusion of every basketball season.

Winners

The winning team of the LKL Finals receives the LKL Championship Trophy. Žalgiris were the first winner of the trophy, in 1994, after defeating Atletas, three games to zero. Žalgiris has since won the trophy 19 times, and Lietuvos Rytas 5 times.

See also
List of Lithuanian basketball league champions
Basketball in Lithuania

External links 
 Official LKL website
 Official LKL YouTube.com channel
 Lithuanian league at Eurobasket.com

Lietuvos krepšinio lyga awards